Robert Francis Lynch (1856–1938) was a New Zealand cricketer. He played three first-class matches for Wellington between 1881 and 1884.

See also
 List of Wellington representative cricketers

References

External links
 

1856 births
1938 deaths
New Zealand cricketers
Wellington cricketers
Place of birth missing